{{Automatic taxobox
| image = Chtenopteryx sicula 1.jpg
| image_caption = Chtenopteryx sicula
| parent_authority = Grimpe, 1922
| taxon = Chtenopteryx
| authority = Appellöf, 1890
| type_species = Sepioteuthis sicula
| display_parents = 5
| type_species_authority = Vérany, 1851<ref name = WoRMS>{{cite web | url = http://www.marinespecies.org/aphia.php?p=taxdetails&id=137785 | title = 'Chtenopteryx Appellöf, 1890 | accessdate = 25 February 2018 | publisher = Flanders Marine Institute | author = Julian Finn | year = 2016 | work = World Register of Marine Species}}</ref>
| subdivision_ranks = Species
| subdivision = See text
}}Chtenopteryx is a genus of small, muscular, midwater squid in the monotypic family Chtenopterygidae. Four species are presently recognized in the genus, but more are believed to exist.

These squid occupy tropical to subtropical waters, probably at depths of between 500 and 1,000 m during the day and near-surface waters at night.

The genus contains bioluminescent species.

Species
 Chtenopteryx canariensis Salcedo-Vargas & Guerrero-Kommritz, 2000
 Chtenopteryx chuni * Pfeffer, 1912 
 Chtenopteryx sepioloides Rancurel, 1970
 Chtenopteryx sicula'' (Vérany, 1851), comb-finned squid or toothed-fin squid

The species listed above with an asterisk (*) is questionable and needs further study to determine if it is a valid species or a synonym.

References

External links

 Tree of Life web project: Chtenopteryx

Squid
Bioluminescent molluscs
Taxa named by Adolf Appellöf